Moutier-Malcard is a commune in the Creuse department in the Nouvelle-Aquitaine region in central France.

Geography
The Petite Creuse river forms the southern boundary of the commune.

Population

Sights
 The church of St. Martin, dating from the twelfth century.
 A fifteenth-century donjon and stone cross.

See also
Communes of the Creuse department

References

Communes of Creuse